Eerik is a masculine given name most commonly found in Estonia and Finland. It is a cognate of the English language name Eric. Men and boys named Eerik celebrate name day in Finland and Estonia on 18 May.

Eerik may refer to:
Eerik Aps (born 1987), Estonian wrestler
Eerik Haamer (1908–1994), Estonian painter
Eerik Idarand (born 1991), Estonian speed skater
Eerik Jago (born 1980), Estonian volleyball player
Eerik-Niiles Kross (born 1967), Estonian diplomat, intelligence chief, entrepreneur and politician 
Eerik Kumari (1912–1984), Estonian biologist, founder of ornithology and nature conservation in Estonia
Eerik Kantola (born 2000), Finnish football player
Eerik Siikasaari (born 1957), Finnish jazz bassist, member of Trio Töykeät
Eerik-Juhan Truuväli (1938–2019), Estonian lawyer, professor and politician

Other
Eerik Kumari Award, an award given to those who have excelled in bioscience in Estonia since 1989

References

Estonian masculine given names
Finnish masculine given names